Pharcidodes rubiginosus is a species of beetle in the family Cerambycidae. It was described by Thomson in 1878.

References

Piezocerini
Beetles described in 1878